The Greenwood Military Aviation Museum is an aviation museum located in Greenwood, Nova Scotia. The museum houses 15 aircraft and is highlighted by its Avro Lancaster, one of only 17 remaining in the world and one of only three to have flown sorties over continental Europe.

History 
The Greenwood Military Aviation Museum is located on CFB Greenwood. The base began its life in 1942 as RAF Station Greenwood, and in July 1944 became RCAF Station Greenwood. Following the Unification of the Canadian Armed Forces in 1968 the base became CFB Greenwood. The museum was begun in 1992 after being initiated by base commander Colonel Kenneth Allen (1941-2017). Since its inception the collection has grown to encompass a large array of aircraft from throughout the RCAF's history.

Collection

Airplanes

UAVs

Helicopters

References 

Aerospace museums in Nova Scotia
Military and war museums in Canada